The Kentucky Department of Education (KY DOE) is an agency within the government of Kentucky that is responsible for regulating education in the state.

History 
The Kentucky Department of Education became an official organization in 1924. Its headquarters is located in Frankfort, Kentucky.

In 1848, Kentucky citizens voted for a law that allowed taxation to support schools. In 1938, a new law was passed allowing vocational-technical schools to be formed. In 1956, vocational-technical schools were expanded to help those who were blind, with a focus on providing training and jobs for the visually impaired. The vocational schools became controlled, like other public schools in the state, by the Department of Education in 1962. The Kentucky Education Reform Act (KERA) became a law in 1990, and is enforced by the Kentucky Department of Education. KRS 159.010 is a Kentucky law that requires children aged between 6 and 16 to attend school. This law was modified by a 2013 Senate bill, raising the mandatory attendance age to 18 beginning in the 2015–2016 school year. The Department of Education partners with the School Improvement Network to use programs such as PD 360 and Common Core 360 to educate students.

Kentucky Board of Education 
The Kentucky Board of Education was established 1838. The board consisted ex officio members with limited ability to function effectively as the members had other responsibilities within the state. The board's powers, at that time, included creating laws, establishing a course of study and choosing course texts, and control of funds and property. The Board of Education is responsible for granting certificates for high school graduates and teacher training.

The Kentucky Board of Education consists of 11 members. The governor of Kentucky appoints the members, and they are confirmed by both the state House of Representatives and the Senate. The board members political affiliation is not considered in appointments. Board members must be at least 30 years old, have an associates degree or higher, and lived in Kentucky for at least three years. Each member serves for four years. Today the board's primary purpose is to make and adopt regulations and policies.

The state Board of Education has power over all of the schools in the state. Local boards of education have power over each of the schools located within its district. Each district board deals with issues that are of interest to the district.

There have been conflicts between the Board of Education and the Department of Education. The Kentucky Department of Education has jurisdiction over county boards. In November 2015 the Knox County Board of Education was investigated by the Kentucky Department of Education for violating Kentucky laws such as including personal matters in district rules that disrupt operations and providing free resources to independent schools.

Positions

Superintendent 
The 1838 law that established a Board of Education in Kentucky also called for the governor to select a superintendent to serve for a two-years term. A law passed in 1850 allowed the superintendent to serve for four years and be elected by the people. An 1891 law prohibits the re-election of superintendents.

The superintendent approves the building of new schools, monitors spending, and ensures school administrations follow laws passed by the Board of Education. In 1893 the power of selecting books was given to the superintendent. Superintendents are required to work full-time in an office in Frankfort.

Notable superintendents include John Cabell Breckinridge, the superintendent in 1849, and Lyman V. Ginger, the superintendent in 1974. The current superintendent is Dr. Jason E. Glass.

Other 
Other positions include a deputy superintendent and secretary. There are multiple assistant superintendent positions focused on instruction, rehabilitation services, vocational education, pupil personnel services, instruction, administration, finance, state relations, and federal relations.

See also 

 Kentucky government
 List of Counties in Kentucky
 List of School Districts in Kentucky
 Kentucky Education Reform Act

References 

Government agencies established in 1924
State agencies of Kentucky
State departments of education of the United States
Public education in Kentucky
1924 establishments in Kentucky